The common ringed plover or ringed plover (Charadrius hiaticula) is a small plover that breeds in Arctic Eurasia. The genus name Charadrius is a Late Latin word for a yellowish bird mentioned in the fourth-century Vulgate. It derives from Ancient Greek kharadrios a bird found in ravines and river valleys (kharadra, "ravine"). The specific hiaticula is  Latin and has a similar meaning to the Greek term, coming from  hiatus, "cleft" and -cola, "dweller" (colere, "to dwell").

Description
They have a grey-brown back and wings, a white belly, and a white breast with one black neckband. They have a brown cap, a white forehead, a black mask around the eyes and a short orange and black bill. The legs are orange and only the outer two toes are slightly webbed, unlike the slightly smaller but otherwise very similar semipalmated plover, which has all three toes slightly webbed, and also a marginally narrower breast band; it was in former times included in the present species. Juvenile ringed plovers are duller than the adults in colour, with an often incomplete grey-brown breast band, a dark bill and dull yellowish-grey legs.

This species differs from the smaller little ringed plover in leg colour, the head pattern, and the lack of an obvious yellow eye-ring.

Breeding, range and habitat
The common ringed plover's breeding habitat is open ground on beaches or flats across northern Eurosiberia  and in Arctic northeast Canada. Some birds breed inland, and in western Europe they nest as far south as northern France. They nest on the ground in an open area with little or no plant growth.

If a potential predator approaches the nest, the adult will walk away from the scrape, calling to attract the intruder and feigning a broken wing. Once the intruder is far enough from the nest, the plover flies off.

Common ringed plovers are migratory and winter in coastal areas south to Africa. In Norway, geolocators have revealed that adult breeding birds migrate to West Africa. Many birds in Great Britain and northern France are resident throughout the year.

Feeding
These birds forage for food on beaches, tidal flats and fields, usually by sight. They eat insects, crustaceans and worms.

Subspecies
There are three weakly defined subspecies, which vary slightly in size and mantle colour; they intergrade where their ranges meet:
 C. h. psammodroma – Salomonsen, 1930: breeds in Iceland, Greenland, northeast Canada; winters in west Africa. It is intermediate in size and colour.
 C. h. hiaticula – Linnaeus, 1758: breeds from temperate western Europe north to central Scandinavia; resident or short-distance migrant to southwest Europe. It is the largest and palest subspecies.
 C. h. tundrae – (Lowe, 1915): breeds in Arctic northern Scandinavia and Asiatic Russia; winters in Africa and southwest Asia. It is the smallest and darkest subspecies.

C. h. hiaticula and C. h. tundrae are among the taxa to which the Agreement on the Conservation of African-Eurasian Migratory Waterbirds (AEWA) applies.

Gallery

References

External links
 Ageing and sexing (PDF; 3.9 MB) by Javier Blasco-Zumeta & Gerd-Michael Heinze
 Ringed plover species text in The Atlas of Southern African Birds
 
 
 
 
 
 

common ringed plover
Birds of Africa
Birds of Europe
Birds of Greenland
Birds of Iceland
Birds of Russia
Birds of Scandinavia
common ringed plover
Taxa named by Carl Linnaeus
Holarctic birds